Kim Lembryk  (born 19 February 1966) is an Australian former footballer who played as a midfielder for the Australia women's national soccer team. She was part of the team at the 1995 FIFA Women's World Cup. At the club level, she played for Marconi Stallions in Australia.

References

External links
 

1966 births
Living people
Australian women's soccer players
Australia women's international soccer players
Place of birth missing (living people)
1995 FIFA Women's World Cup players
Women's association football midfielders